Putnam is an unincorporated community in Harvey County, Kansas, United States.  It is located southwest of Newton at the intersection of West Road and SW 60th Street, along the BNSF Railway.

History
Putnam had a post office from 1891 until 1907.

Geography
Putnam is located at coordinates 37.9689005, -97.3878166 in the state of Kansas.  The community is located south of Newton near SW 60th and S. West Road.  It was established along a former railroad line between Newton and Wichita.

Education
The community is served by Sedgwick USD 439 public school district.

References

Further reading

External links
 Harvey County Maps: Current, Historic, KDOT

Unincorporated communities in Harvey County, Kansas
Unincorporated communities in Kansas